Azimabad (also Romanized as ‘Az̧īmābād) is a village in Jolgeh Rural District Rural District, Shahrabad District, Bardaskan County, Razavi Khorasan Province, Iran. At the 2006 census, its population was 1,075, in 287 families.

See also 

 List of cities, towns and villages in Razavi Khorasan Province

References 

Populated places in Bardaskan County